The 450 SEL 6.9 is the high-performance version of the W116 S-Class saloon. It was based on the long-wheelbase version of W116 chassis introduced in 1972 and equipped with Mercedes-Benz M100 V8 engine and full hydropneumatic suspension system. The 450 SEL 6.9 was presented to the public at the Geneva Auto Show in 1974 as the successor to the original high-performance saloon from Mercedes-Benz, the 300 SEL 6.3 (1968–1972). Like the 300 SEL 6.3, the nomenclate, 6.9, was affixed to the trunk lid as to differentiate itself from 450 SEL. The 450 SEL 6.9 was produced in a very limited number from 1975 to 1981.

The 450 SEL 6.9 had the first full four-wheel hydropneumatic suspension system from Mercedes-Benz and was the world’s first passenger car to be fitted with modern form of ABS, electronic four-wheel multi-channel anti-lock braking system from Bosch, in 1978.

For several years, the 450 SEL 6.9 was the quickest-accelerating and fastest European saloon, reaching  in 7.4 seconds and  top speed. 

The total production from 1975 to 1980 was 7,380 units with 1,816 exported to the North American markets (United States and Canada) from 1977 to 1981.

M100 engine
The 6.3-litre M100 V8 engine, originally fitted to 600 and 300 SEL 6.3, was enlarged to 6.8 litres (6,834 cubic centimetres or 417 cubic inches) by boring out to 107 mm. The stricter emission regulations in the mid-1970s necessitated the larger displacement as to compensate for the lowered output. The fuel injection system was upgraded to the third-generation mechanically controlled, continuous-injection system Bosch K-Jetronic.

Due to its sheer size, the engineers fitted the dry sump oil lubrication system as to lower the engine height and preserve the low hood line. The dry sump system had larger capacity at 12 litres rather than 5 litres for the wet sump system fitted to the smaller M116 and M117 V8 engines. The dipstick was moved from the engine block to the oil tank’s filler cap. The larger oil capacity extended the oil change interval to 20,000 km (12,500 miles).

During its entire production run, the engine displacement of 6.8 litres was the largest V8 engine ever built by Mercedes-Benz and by European manufacturer after the Second World War.

Suspension
The full hydropneumatic self-levelling suspension system from Mercedes-Benz was first introduced in 450 SEL 6.9 as a standard equipment. The other W116 models used the hydropneumatic system for the rear suspension only as level control under heavy load (Option No. 48/0, "Niveauregulierung"). The full system was exclusive to 450 SEL 6.9 until 1981 when the next generation, HPF II, was offered as an extra-cost option for W126 380 SEL and 500 SEL. The 600 and W109 used the air suspension for self-levelling.

The Mercedes-Benz system differentiated from Citroën system, introduced in 1954, in some ways. Mercedes-Benz used the timing chain to drive the hydraulic pump instead of rubber belt in Citroën system. Citroën system used a single pump to send the vegetable oil (and later mineral oil) to the brake boost, power steering, power clutch (when equipped with semi-automatic transmission), and hydropneumatic suspension system. Mercedes-Benz system had the separate pumps for brake boost, power steering, and hydropneumatic suspension, citing the better failsafe measures than Citroën in the event of a hydraulic failure. The Mercedes-Benz system contained the hard rubber dampers that served as temporary springs and allowed the car to be driven if the hydraulic pump or components failed. Both manufacturers had different approaches when the cars were parked and switched off. Citroën lowered themselves closer to the ground while Mercedes-Benz did not. Mercedes-Benz suspension system has the feature that maintains body level without squatting at the rear or diving in the front during the acceleration and braking respectively.

North American market

Initially, Mercedes-Benz did not plan on selling the 450 SEL 6.9 in the United States given the oil crisis that hit the Americans very hard and increasingly tightening emission regulations. Mercedes-Benz had difficulties in meeting the European demand. However, the strong requests from the customers and dealers reversed the decision.

For the United States market, 450 SEL 6.9 was marketed simply as 6.9 and as sole affixation to the trunk lid on the right side. The retail price was more than $38,230 ($177,554 adjusted for 2021) for the 1977 model year and increased to $52,995 ($185,071) at the end of production in 1980.

The 6.9 was fitted with four  sealed beam 5.75" round capsule headlights with bezels and larger impact absorbing bumpers that lengthened the car by 11 inches. Due to the US FMVSS bumper standard, the variable height suspension was disabled, and the height adjustment knob was removed. To differentiate the 6.9 from other W116 models, the bumpers had thicker black rubber strip covering the entire width and without the rubber bumper guards. 

Price

The retail price of 450 SEL 6.9 was DM 69,930 at its launch in 1975 and was DM 81,247 at the end of its production in 1980. The 450 SEL 6.9 had a premium of DM 25,000 to 30,000 over the 450 SEL.

While 450 SEL 6.9 was visually indistinguishable from the other W116 models, 450 SEL 6.9 had wider wheels and tyres along with 6.9 on the right side of trunk lid. 450 SEL 6.9 had more standard features that were extra cost options in other W116 models: automatic HVAC system, power windows, power rear seats, headrests for the rear passengers, central locking system, headlamp washer and wiper system, heat-insulating glass, and a few other equipments.

Interior features
Despite the higher retail price, the interior of the 450 SEL 6.9 was indistinguishable from the other W116 models except for the different type of wood trims, height adjustment knob, and two extra warning lamps in the instrument cluster for the low suspension pressure warning and height adjustment indicator. Heated seats for driver and front and rear passengers as well as electric sunroof were extra cost options. No power-assisted external rear view mirrors and seat adjustments, commonly fitted to luxury cars such as Cadillac and Rolls-Royce during the 1970s, were ever offered in the 450 SEL 6.9.

The first-ever automatic HVAC system from Mercedes-Benz was introduced in the 450 SEL 6.9 as a standard equipment and as optional extra-cost equipment in other W116 models. The automatic HVAC system was adapted from Chrysler Corporation and had a compressor from Harrison division of General Motors.

The 450 SEL 6.9 had exclusive wood trim finished in burled walnut veneer on the dash and console instead of striated zebrano veneer as found in other W116 models.

Cultural references
 After the persistent rumours, the French director Claude Lelouche revealed the car he used to drive through Paris at a very high speed to the rendezvous point at Montmartre in his eight-minute film, C'était un rendez-vous. He used a 1976 450 SEL 6.9 with the camera mounted under the front bumper. He used the sound track from the Ferrari 275 GTB, giving the impression that he drove a Ferrari.
 The 450 SEL 6.9 was driven by Vincent, one of the protagonists in Ronin, and was involved in several of the film's car chase scenes.
 In David Lynch's 1996 film, Lost Highway, a 450 SEL 6.9 was used as a major plot device, connecting all three main male characters in the film. In one scene, the hood was lifted up to reveal the 1,400-horsepower engine modification. In another scene, the car was used to push a Ford Thunderbird off the road despite the latter applying the brakes.

Technical data

References

External links
 International M-100 Group — Factory-authorized site with information on all M-100-powered Mercedes-Benz automobiles, (including technical forums and maintenance information). The Brock Yates article can be found here as well
 A Mercedes for the '70s: The W116 Series S-Class — A site mixing the history of the full-scale W116 with that of its many miniature replicas.
 Classic Car driver review
 Golden Brown: Four Days in a Mercedes-Benz 450SEL 6.9 - Feature (Car and Driver)
 Curbside Classic: 1977 Mercedes 450 SEL 6.9 – Deutsches Heavy Metal – a retrospective of the 450SEL 6.9
 Petrolicious: Mercedes-Benz 450SEL 6.9 Was All About Engineering – another retrospective of the 450SEL 6.9
 Youtube clip of Ronin high-speed chase featuring a 6.9

450SEL 6.9
Rear-wheel-drive vehicles